Milivoj Jugin (22 August 1925, Kikinda - 20 January 2013) was a Yugoslav and Serbian aeronautical engineer, constructor, publicist and popularizer of science.

History
Under influence of family friend Kosta Sivčev, an aircraft designer, Jugin graduated aerospace engineering on Faculty of Mechanical Engineering of Belgrade University, and then he continued his education in the Soviet Union. Jugin was part of engineering team led by Sivčev and Zlatko Rendulić that designed Yugoslav first mass-produced jet Soko G-2 Galeb.

He was an expert commentator on Belgrade Television, and participated in many astronautical congresses, including at the 1968 United Nations Conference on the Exploration and Peaceful Uses of Outer Space (UNISPACE I) held in Vienna. He visited the Cape Kennedy cosmodrome twice in the US and stayed in the Star City of the Soviet cosmonauts near Moscow. Jugin has collaborated in numerous newspapers and magazines and, as expert, reported live from Cape Kennedy launch of Apollo 11, and then returned to Belgrade to host broadcast of Armstrong's and Aldrin's landing on Moon.

Bibliography 
 Kosmos otkriva tajne (Cosmos Reveals Secrets). 
 Svi smo kosmonauti (We All Are Cosmonauts). 
 Večni trag (Eternal Trace)

References 

2013 deaths
Yugoslav engineers
1925 births
People from Kikinda
Serbian engineers